The Portland Grand Prix was a sports car race held at the Portland International Raceway in Portland, Oregon from 1978 until 2006.  It began as a round of the IMSA GT Championship, and became an American Le Mans Series race in 1999.

Winners

External links
World Sports Racing Prototypes: IMSA archive
Ultimate Racing History: Portland archive

 
Recurring sporting events established in 1978
Recurring events disestablished in 2006
1978 establishments in Oregon
Sports in Portland, Oregon